Ma'ariful Qur'an is an eight-volume tafsir (exegesis) of the Quran written by Islamic scholar Mufti Muhammad Shafi (1897–1976). Originally written in Urdu, it is the most prominent work of its author.

Background
About the background and starting of Ma'ariful Qur'an, Mufti Muhammad Taqi Usmani has written in the foreword of the English translation of the same:

Structure
The work consists of eight volumes. A detailed introduction, included at the beginning of the first volume, focuses on some of the basic issues of the Quran. Notable among them are the wahy, the modes of descent, the chronology of the revelation of the Quran, the first revealed verses (ayah), Meccan and Medinan verses, the preservation of the Quran, the printing of the Quran, the sources of tafsir, Arabic language etc.
The work adopts a simple narrative style: first, several verses are provided in the original Arabic with their literal translation in Urdu; it is then followed by subject-wise discussion on almost every important issue. This narrative technique is repeated until the end. Below is the list of volumes and their contents:
 The first volume—Sura Al-Fatiha and sura Al-Baqara
 The second volume – from sura Al-Imran to sura An-Nisa
 The third volume – from sura Al-Ma'ida to sura Al-A'raf
 The fourth volume – from sura Al-Anfal to sura Hud
 The fifth volume – from sura Yusuf to sura Al-Kahf
 The sixth volume – from sura Maryam to sura Ar-Rum
 The seventh volume – from sura Luqman to sura Al-Ahqaf
 The eighth volume – from sura Muhammad to Surat al-Nas.

Sources
In the introduction of Ma'ariful Qur'an, the author has mentioned the sources he has taken help from in compiling this voluminous work. Some of them are:

 Tafsir al-Tabari, by Abu Jafar Muhammad ibn Jarir Tabari
 Tafsir ibn Kathir, by Ibn Kathir
 Tafsir al-Qurtubi, by Al-Qurtubi
Tafsir al-Bahr al-Muhit, by Abu Hayyan al-Gharnati
Ahkam al-Quran by Al-Jaṣṣās
 Tafsir al-Kabir, by Imam Fakhruddin Razi
 Dur al-Manthur, by Jalaluddin Al-Suyuti
Tafsir al-Mazhari, by Qadi Thanaullah Panipati
Ruh al-Ma'ani, by Mahmud al-Alusi

Translations

Gujarati 
 Gujarati Quran અહસનુલ બયાન
Ma'ariful Qur'an has been translated into Gujarati by Ilyas Patel Khanpuri. The complete eight volumes of Maariful Quran Translated into Gujarati language with eleven volumes by Ilyas Patel Khanpuri. Website: http://www.maarifulqurangujarati.com

English
Ma'ariful Qur'an has been translated into English by Prof. Muhammad Hasan Askari and Prof. Muhammad Shamim, and revised by Mufti Muhammad Taqi Usmani. It has been published from Karachi.

Bengali 
The complete eight volumes of Ma'ariful Qur'an have been translated into Bengali by Maulana Muhiuddin Khan and published from Dhaka by Islamic Foundation Bangladesh.

See also
 List of tafsir works
 List of Sunni books

References

External links 
 
The Methodology of Mufti Muhammad Shafi' (R.A) in Tafseer Bil Diraya
 
 
 Gujarati Quran
 English Ma'ariful Qur'an
 English Ma'ariful Qur'an in PDF
Gujarati Translation of Ma'ariful Qur'an

Sunni tafsir
Deobandi literature
Tafsir works